Anthology of American Folk Music is a three-album compilation, released in 1952 by Folkways Records, of eighty-four recordings of American folk, blues and country music made and issued from 1926 to 1933 by a variety of performers. The album was compiled from experimental film maker Harry Smith's own personal collection of 78 rpm records.

Upon its release the Anthology did not gain recognition as it had sold relatively poorly and had no notable early coverage besides a minor 1958 mention in Sing Out! The album is now, however, generally regarded as a landmark release in the history of the album as well as an influential release during the 1950s and 1960s for the American folk music revival. In 2003, Rolling Stone ranked the album at number 276 on their list of The 500 Greatest Albums of All Time, and, in 2005, the album was inducted into the National Recording Registry by the Library of Congress.

Background
Harry Smith was a West Coast filmmaker, magickian, bohemian, and eccentric. As a teenager he started collecting old blues, jazz, country, Cajun, and gospel records and accumulated a large collection of recordings, 78s being the only medium at the time.

In 1947, he met with Moses Asch, with an interest in selling or licensing the collection to Asch's label, Folkways Records. Smith wrote that he selected recordings from between "1927, when electronic recording made possible accurate music reproduction, and 1932, when the Great Depression halted folk music sales." When the Anthology was released, neither Folkways nor Smith possessed the licensing rights to these recordings, many of which had initially been issued by record companies that were still in existence, including Columbia and Paramount. The anthology thus technically qualifies as a high-profile bootleg.  Folkways would later obtain some licensing rights, although the Anthology would not be completely licensed until the 1997 Smithsonian reissue. It seems that Folkways founder Moses Asch had a "reputation for releasing copyrighted songs without going through the proper legal channels."

Sequencing 

The compilation was divided by Smith into three two-album volumes: "Ballads," "Social Music," and "Songs." As the title indicates, the first "Ballads" volume consists of ballads, including many American versions of Child Ballads originating from the English folk tradition. Each song tells a story about a specific event or time, and Smith may have made some effort to organize to suggest a historical narrative, a theory suggested by the fact that many of the first songs in this volume are old English folk ballads, while the closing songs of the volume deal with the hardships of being a farmer in the 1920s.

The first album in the "social music" volume largely consists of music that was likely performed at social gatherings or dances, with many of the songs being instrumentals. The second album in the "Social Music" volume consists of religious and spiritual songs, including some Gospel songs.

The third "Songs" volume consists of regular songs, dealing with everyday life. Critic Greil Marcus describes its thematic interests as being "marriage, labor, dissipation, prison, and death."

Smith's booklet in the original release makes reference to three additional planned volumes in the series, which would anthologize music up until 1950. Although none were released during his lifetime, a fourth volume was released posthumously in 2000. Entitled "Labor Songs", this volume is themed around songs about work and mainly featured union songs. The album contains later material then the original three volumes, anthologizing material recorded as late as 1940.

Design 
The design of the anthology was edited and directed by Smith himself.  He created the liner notes himself, and these notes are almost as well known as the music, using an unusual fragmented, collage method that presaged some postmodern artwork.  Smith also penned short synopses of the songs in the collection, which read like newspaper headlines—for the song "King Kong Kitchie Kitchie Ki-Me-O" by Chubby Parker, a song about a mouse marrying a frog, Smith notes: "Zoologic Miscegeny Achieved Mouse Frog nuptials, Relatives Approve."

Each of the three two-record sets carried the same cover art, a Theodore de Bry etching of an instrument Smith referred to as the "Celestial Monochord," taken from a mystical treatise by scientist/alchemist Robert Fludd. This etching was printed over against a different color background for each volume of the set: blue, red and green. Smith had incorporated both the music and the art into his own unusual cosmology, and each of these colors was considered by Smith to correspond to an alchemical classical element: Water, Fire, and Air, respectively. The fourth 'Labour' volume (released later by Revenant) is colored yellow to represent the element earth.

Release and reissues 

The Anthology was originally released as three double-LP box sets on August 9, 1952. It sold relatively poorly when it was first released – by 1953, Folkways had sold only fifty albums, forty-seven of which went to libraries and colleges – and for a time, it was out of print because of copyright issues.

One of the first notable reissues was in the 1960s, released as three individual volumes like the original release. Irwin Silber replaced Smith's covers with a Ben Shahn photograph of a poor Depression-era farmer, over Smith's objections, although others have considered this a wise commercial choice in the politically charged atmosphere of the folk movement during that decade.

In 1997, Smithsonian Folkways Recordings, having acquired Folkways Records in 1986, reissued the collection on six compact discs, each disc corresponding to each album of the original set on vinyl, including replicas of Smith's original artwork and liner booklet. An additional booklet included expanded track information for each song by Jeff Place, excerpts from Invisible Republic by Greil Marcus, essays by Jon Pankake, Luis Kemnitzer, Moses Asch, and Neil Rosenberg, and tributes and appreciations by John Fahey, John Cohen, Elvis Costello, Peter Stampfel, Lucy Sante, Dave Van Ronk, Eric Von Schmidt, Chuck Pirtle, and Allen Ginsberg. The back cover to this booklet closes with a quote by Smith: "I'm glad to say that my dreams came true. I saw America changed through music." At the 40th Grammy Awards, the reissue won awards for Best Album Notes and Best Historical Album.

In 2006, Shout! Factory and the Harry Smith Archive released a tribute album titled The Harry Smith Project: The Anthology of American Folk Music Revisited, a 2-CD/2-DVD box set culled from a series of concerts staged by Hal Willner that took place in 1999 and 2001. The album features artists such as Beck, Nick Cave, Elvis Costello, Steve Earle, Beth Orton, Lou Reed, Sonic Youth, Richard Thompson, Wilco and others, covering the songs of the original anthology.

In 2020, Dust-to-Digital released a compilation containing the B-Sides of the records included on the Anthology titled The Harry Smith B-Sides. Some songs were not included due to the racist or offensive nature of the lyrics, which drew criticism from reviewers.

Reception and legacy 

Writing for AllMusic, critic John Bush wrote the compilation "could well be the most influential document of the '50s folk revival. Many of the recordings that appeared on it had languished in obscurity for 20 years, and it proved a revelation to a new group of folkies, from Pete Seeger to John Fahey to Bob Dylan... Many of the most interesting selections on the Anthology, however, are taken from [obscure] artists... such as Clarence Ashley, Bascom Lamar Lunsford, and Buell Kazee." In his review for The Village Voice, music critic Robert Christgau wrote "Harry Smith's act of history... aces two very '90s concepts: the canon that accrues as rock gathers commentary, and the compilations that multiply as labels recycle catalogue. In its time, it wrested the idea of the folk from ideologues and ethnomusicologists by imagining a commercial music of everyday pleasure and alienation—which might as well have been conceived to merge with a rock and roll that didn't yet exist... Somebody you know is worth the 60 bucks it'll run you. So are you." Jon Pareles, writing in The New York Times, said that the songs "still sound marvelous and uncanny."

In 2003, the album was ranked number 276 on Rolling Stone magazine's list of the 500 greatest albums of all time, and 278 in a 2012 revised list.  It is the earliest-released album on that list and also includes the oldest recordings (dating back to Uncle Dave Macon's recording of "Way Down the Old Plank Road" in April 1926). In 2005 the album was inducted into the National Recording Registry by the Library of Congress  for being "culturally, aesthetically, or historically significant". In 2007, the album was listed in The Guardian's list of 1000 Albums to Hear Before You Die. The album was included in the 2008 book 1000 Recordings to Hear Before You Die, as well as the 2009 book 101 Albums That Changed Popular Music. In 2012, the album was inducted into the Grammy Hall of Fame.

Though relatively little was written about the Anthology during the first years after release (the first known press reference to the collection was in the folk music magazine Sing Out! in 1958, which focused on Clarence Ashley’s "The Coo Coo") musicians and writers relate how much of an impact it had on them at the time. The music on the compilation provided direct inspiration to much of the emergent folk music revival movement. The anthology made available music which previously had been largely the preserve of marginal social economic groups. Many people who first heard this music through the Anthology came from very different cultural and economic backgrounds from its original creators and listeners. Many previously obscure songs became standards at hootenannies and folk clubs due to their inclusion on the Anthology. Some of the musicians represented on the Anthology saw their musical careers revived, and made additional recordings and live appearances. This release is generally thought to have been massively influential on the folk & blues revival of the 1950s and 1960s, and brought the works of Blind Lemon Jefferson, Mississippi John Hurt, Dick Justice and many others to the attention of musicians such as Bob Dylan and Joan Baez.  The "Harry Smith Anthology," as some call it, was the bible of folk music during the late 1950s and early 1960s Greenwich Village folk scene. As stated in the liner notes to the 1997 reissue, the late musician Dave van Ronk had earlier commented that "we all knew every word of every song on it, including the ones we hated."

The Anthology has had major historical influence. Smith's method of sequencing tracks, along with his inventive liner notes, called attention to the set. This reintroduction of near-forgotten popular styles of rural American music from the selected years to new listeners had impact on American ethnomusicology and was both directly and indirectly responsible for the American folk music revival.

Sing Out! published a full article on the whole release in 1969.

In surveying the critical writing on the Anthology, Rory Crutchfield writes, "[t]his is one of the strangest aspects of the critical heritage of the Anthology: its emergence from relative obscurity to prominence as a revivalist manifesto without much transition. In terms of academic credibility, this partly came from the work of [Robert] Cantwell and [Greil] Marcus, which was published fairly close to the reissue of the collection."

Track listing

Production personnel 
Moses Asch: Liner Notes, Transfers
Peter Bartok: Transfers
Joe Bussard: Transfers
Philip Coady: Producer
Pat Conte: Transfers
Evelyn Esaki: Art Direction
John Fahey: Liner Notes
David Glasser: Mastering, Audio Restoration
Amy Horowitz: Executive Producer, Reissue Producer
Luis Kemnitzer: Liner Notes
Kip Lornell: Liner Notes
Michael Maloney: Producer, Production Coordination
Greil Marcus: Liner Notes
Mary Monseur: Producer, Production Coordination
Steve Moreland: Producer
Jon Pankake: Liner Notes
Charlie Pilzer: Mastering, Audio Restoration, Transfers
Chuck Pirtle: Liner Notes
Jeff Place: Liner Notes, Reissue Producer, Transfers, Annotation
Pete Reiniger: Mastering, Transfers, Compilation Producer
Neil V. Rosenberg: Liner Notes
Lucy Sante: Liner Notes
Peter Seitel: Editing
Harry Smith: Producer, Editorial
Stephanie Smith: Research
Peter Stampfel: Liner Notes
Alan Stoker: Transfers
Scott Stowell: Art Direction, Design
Jack Towers: Transfers
Eric Von Schmidt: Liner Notes

Certifications

See also

Folk music
Harry Smith's Anthology of American Folk Music, Vol. 4
Nuggets: Original Artyfacts from the First Psychedelic Era, 1965–1968-a 1972 compilation album of 60s garage rock compiled by Lenny Kaye
Harry Everett Smith

References

External links
Anthology page on Smithsonian Folkways website

Library of Congress essay on its inclusion into the National Recording Registry.

Recordings
Because of their potential public domain status, some of these recordings are legally available on the Web:
Drunkard's Special by Coley Jones

Folk albums by American artists
Country albums by American artists
1952 compilation albums
Country music compilation albums
Folk compilation albums
Compilation albums by American artists
Blues compilation albums
Smithsonian Folkways compilation albums
United States National Recording Registry recordings
United States National Recording Registry albums